Summit Pass may refer to:
 Summit Pass (British Columbia)
 Summit Pass (Colorado), a place in Colorado
 Summit Pass (Oregon)

See also